Hamadi Daou may refer to:

Hamadi Dhaou (born 1940), Tunisian footballer
Hammadi Daou (born 1968), Tunisian football manager